Mućkalica is a Serbian dish, a stew made of barbecued meat and vegetables. Its name is derived from mućkati, meaning "to shake, stir, mix".

Meat from different animals, as well as various cuts from the same type of animal, are used to make a mućkalica: what a cocktail is for beverages, mućkalica is for barbecue. There are various regional styles of mućkalicas, such as Leskovačka mućkalica, the most popular, and Toplička mućkalica. It is usually made from cold, leftover barbecued meat which is stewed with various other ingredients.

See also

 Leskovac Grill Festival
 List of barbecue dishes
 List of stews

References

Serbian cuisine
Stews
Leskovac
Pork dishes